Barru Regency is a regency of South Sulawesi Province of Indonesia. It covers an area of 1,174.72 km2 and had a population of 165,983 at the 2010 Census and 184,452 at the 2020 Census; the official estimate as at mid 2021 was 185,525. The principal town lies at Barru.

Administration 
Barru Regency in 2020, as in 2010, comprised seven administrative Districts (Kecamatan), tabulated below from south to north with their areas and their populations at the 2010 Census and at the 2020 Census, together with the official estimates as at mid 2021. The table also includes the location of the district administrative centres,the numbers of administrative villages (rural desa and urban kelurahan) in each district, and its postal code(s).

Notes: (a) except the desa of Garessi, which has a post code of 90711. (b) except the kelurahan of Mallawa, which has a post code of 90711.

References

Regencies of South Sulawesi